COSMIC-2 also known as FORMOSAT-7, is the  constellation of satellites for meteorology, ionosphere, climatology, and space weather research.  FORMOSAT-7 is a joint US-Taiwanese project including National Space Organization (NSPO) on the Taiwanese side and the National Oceanic and Atmospheric Administration (NOAA) and the United States Air Force (USAF) on the US side. FORMOSAT-7 is the successor of FORMOSAT-3 The six satellites of the constellation were launched 25 June 2019 on a Falcon Heavy rocket. They reached their designated mission orbits in February 2021, after eighteen months of gradual orbital adjustments. Full operational capability was achieved in October 2021.

Pre-launch
On the morning of 14 April 2019, President Tsai Ing-wen traveled to Hsinchu City to take part in send-off activities for the Formosat-7 satellite. She commended the hard work and accomplishments of the research and development team, and hailed Formosat-7 as a milestone in promoting Taiwan's technological diplomacy, noting that she expected the satellite would display the brilliance of Taiwan's aerospace technology on the international stage.

On 15 April the satellites were placed aboard a Taiwanese China Airlines cargo plane at Taoyuan International Airport. The six satellites were packed in three climate controlled transport crates. The satellites were shipped as diplomatic pouch to speed their journey through US customs, the first time a satellite had been shipped as such.

Design

78% of components for the satellites were made in Taiwan. The satellites receive signals from both GPS and GLONASS. The constellation collects more than 4,000 pieces of data a day.

Radio-Occultation Payload
The primary payload for the COSMIC-2 Satellite is the Radio Occultation instrument.

This instrument is capable of measuring atmospheric effects by analyzing the propagation of GNSS signals through said atmosphere.

The instrument is composed of the Tri-band GNSS (TriG) RO and POD Receiver and four Antennas:

 Two Radio Occultation Arrays (the Cafeteria Cups Antenna) one Forward, one Aft
 Two Precise Orbit Determination Antennas, one Forward, one Aft

Cafeteria Cups Antenna
Each RO Antenna is composed of three vertical sub-arrays, four elements each.

Each element is a two-turn Helical Spiral. The collected signals from the four vertical elements are combined with a low loss beamformer.

The name 'Cafeteria Cups' comes from the fact that the antenna elements in the very first prototype were made out of plastic cups from the JPL cafeteria.

The Antenna is fabricated out of 3D Printed FDM Ultem 9085.  This makes the COSMIC-2 RO antenna the first 3D printed part on the outside of a Spacecraft to be qualified to NASA Class 2B Spaceflight.

Launch
COSMIC-2 launched on SpaceX's Falcon Heavy from Kennedy Space Center Launch Complex 39A on 25 June 2019.

Post-launch
The first data from COSMIC-2 was made public in March 2020 with the new data improving the accuracy of weather forecasts by 10-11%. All six satellites reached their mission orbits by February 2021. The mission achieved full operational capability in October 2021.

See also

 National Space Organization
 2019 in spaceflight
 FORMOSAT-3/COSMIC

References

External links
FORMOSAT-7 at National Space Organization

Earth observation satellites of Taiwan
Spacecraft launched in 2019
SpaceX commercial payloads